Jennifer Marie Molina Shea (born June 27, 1981, in Mexico City, Mexico) is a Mexican former footballer goalkeeper who played for the Mexico women's national football team. She competed at the 2004 Summer Olympics in Athens, Greece, where the team finished in eighth place. Molina was affiliated with the Colgate University.

References

External links
 
 

1981 births
Living people
Mexican women's footballers
Mexico women's international footballers
Women's association football goalkeepers
Footballers at the 2004 Summer Olympics
Olympic footballers of Mexico
Footballers from Mexico City
Colgate University alumni
Mexican emigrants to the United States
Colgate Raiders women's soccer players
Footballers at the 2003 Pan American Games
Pan American Games bronze medalists for Mexico
Medalists at the 2003 Pan American Games
Pan American Games medalists in football
20th-century Mexican women
21st-century Mexican women
Mexican footballers